The Sutter Union High School District is a school district that operates Brittian Elementary School and Sutter Union High School, both located in the settlement of Sutter, Sutter County, California. The district is separate from the district that governs most schools in the Yuba-Sutter area.

References

External links
 

School districts in Sutter County, California